Tillandsia violacea is a species of epiphytic flowering plant in the family Bromeliaceae. It is endemic to Mexico, particularly to the Central Mexican Plateau. This species' habitat is at elevations between 600 and 3,100 meters, and is epiphytic to large trees in humid temperate forests, primarily the species abies religiosa, quercus rugosa, and quercus laurina. In particular, it is a common epiphyte of the temperate pine forests of Hidalgo state, including El Chico National Park. Its range extends to the states of Guerrero, Jalisco, state of Mexico, Michoacán, Morelos, Oaxaca, and Veracruz. Due to its high-elevation habitat, this bromeliad species has tolerance to sub-freezing conditions.

References

Spatial Distribution Patterns of Tillandsia violacea (Bromeliaceae) and Support Trees in an Altitudinal Gradient from a Temperate Forest in Central Mexico retrieved 1 January 2019

violacea
Flora of Mexico
Taxa named by John Gilbert Baker